The competition for Miss República Dominicana 1994 was held on August 4, 1993. There were 24 candidates, representing provinces and municipalities, who entered. The winner would represent the Dominican Republic at Miss Universe 1994. The first runner-up would enter Miss World 1994. The second runner-up would compete in Miss International 1994.

The remainder of the finalists entered different pageants.

Results

Delegates

† After the first runner up sashed Patricia Bayonet in next year edition, Claudia Franjúl dies at the age of 20 in a car accident.

Miss Dominican Republic
1994 beauty pageants
1994 in the Dominican Republic